The 1998 CAF Champions League was the 34th awarding of Africa's premier club football tournament prize organized by the Confederation of African Football (CAF), and the 2nd edition under the current CAF Champions League format. ASEC Mimosas of Ivory Coast defeated Dynamos Harare of Zimbabwe in the final to win their first title.

Qualifying rounds

Preliminary round

|}
1 Maniema FC withdrew after the 1st leg. 
2 Muni Sport and East End Lions both withdrew. 
3 AS Tempête Mocaf were disqualified for not paying the entry fee.

First round

|}

Second round

|}

Group stage

Group A

Group B

Knockout stage

Final

Top goalscorers

The top scorers from the 1998 CAF Champions League are as follows:

External links
Champions' Cup 1998 - rsssf.com

 
1998 in African football
CAF Champions League seasons